Southwest Schuylkill is a neighborhood in Southwest Philadelphia, along the Schuylkill River north of Elmwood, in the vicinity of the Southeastern Pennsylvania Transportation Authority's R3 railroad tracks.

The Regent-Rennoc Court and Anna Howard Shaw Junior High School are listed to the National Register of Historic Places in 1988.

References

Neighborhoods in Philadelphia
Southwest Philadelphia